Haughom Church is a parish church of the Church of Norway in the large Sirdal Municipality in Agder county, Norway. It is located in the village of Haughom on the eastern shore of the lake Sirdalsvatnet. It one of the four churches in the Sirdal parish which is part of the Lister og Mandal prosti (deanery) in the Diocese of Agder og Telemark. The white, wooden church was built in a long church design in 1930 using plans drawn up by the architect John A. Søyland. The church seats about 150 people.

History
For a long time, the people in the northern part of Bakke municipality had a long journey to the local parish church. After about 10–15 years of discussions and fundraising, a church was built in 1930. The church was consecrated on 9 October 1930 by the Bishop Bernt Støylen.

See also
List of churches in Agder og Telemark

References

Sirdal
Churches in Agder
Wooden churches in Norway
20th-century Church of Norway church buildings
Churches completed in 1930
1930 establishments in Norway